Quercus prinoides, commonly known as dwarf chinkapin oak, dwarf chinquapin oak, dwarf chestnut oak or scrub chestnut oak, is a shrubby, clone-forming oak native to central-eastern North America.

Description 

The dwarf chinkapin oak is a shrub or small tree that typically grows up to 13–20 feet (4–6 meters) tall and 13–20 ft (4–6 m) wide. It sometimes spreads vegetatively by means of underground rhizomes. The leaves of dwarf chinkapin oak closely resemble those of chinkapin oak, but are smaller: 5–15 centimeters (2–6 inches) long, compared to 10–18 cm (4–7 in) long for chinkapin oak.

While similar in foliage and fruits, but with smaller leaves, the dwarf chinkapin oak may also be distinguished from the chinkapin oak by differences in growth habit (the clonally spreading shrubby growth form and smaller proportions of dwarf chinkapin oak, even when grown on rich soils) and habitat (the chinkapin oak is typically found on rocky, calcareous sites, while the dwarf chinkapin oak is more typically found on dry, often acidic, sandy soils or dry shales).

Like all white oaks, Q. prinoides has sweet-tasting green acorns that mature in a single growing season and germinate as soon as they fall to the ground with no winter dormancy. It freely hybridizes with any other species in the white oak group. Flowering and seed production begin at 3–4 years old.

Taxonomy 
Quercus prinoides was named and described by the German botanist Karl (Carl) Ludwig Willdenow in 1801, in a German journal article by the German-American Pennsylvania botanist Gotthilf Heinrich Ernst Muhlenberg. The epithet prinoides refers to its resemblance to Quercus prinus, the chestnut oak.

However, this shrubby oak, now generally accepted as a distinct species, is more closely related to chinkapin oak (Q. muhlenbergii) than to chestnut oak.  These two kinds of oak have sometimes been considered to be conspecific (belonging to the same species), in which case the earlier-published name Q. prinoides has priority, with the larger chinkapin oak then usually classified as Quercus prinoides var. acuminata, and the shrubby form as Q. prinoides var. prinoides. It is roughly analogous to the bear oak, which forms part of the red oak group, but has a much wider distribution than bear oak, which occurs in a relatively small area of the northeastern US.

Distribution 
The species range extends from eastern Nebraska, south to Oklahoma (with an isolated population in Louisiana), east to northern Alabama and Georgia, northeast to New Hampshire, and in southeast Canada, extending as far north as the Carolinian forest zone of southern Ontario. It has a virtually disjunct (discontinuous) distribution, fairly common in New England and in the Appalachian Mountains, and also in the eastern Great Plains but rare in the Ohio Valley in between.

Ecology and uses 

The acorns of dwarf chinkapin oak are sweet tasting and relished by humans and many kinds of wildlife.  The wood has little commercial value because of the shrub's small size.

References

prinoides
Trees of the Northeastern United States
Trees of the North-Central United States
Trees of the Southeastern United States
Trees of Ontario
Flora of the Appalachian Mountains
Least concern flora of the United States
Plants described in 1801
Taxonomy articles created by Polbot